

Definition 
An extreme overvalued belief is shared by others in a person's cultural, religious, or subcultural group (including online). The belief is often relished, amplified, and defended by the possessor of the belief and should be differentiated from a delusion or obsession. Over time, the belief grows more dominant, more refined, and more resistant to challenge. The individual has an intense emotional commitment to the belief and may carry out violent behavior in its service. Over time,  belief becomes increasingly binary, simplistic, and absolute.

The description was first proposed by a group of forensic psychiatrists led by psychiatrist Dr. Tahir Rahman at Washington University in St. Louis in response to an analysis of the insanity trial of Anders Breivik, a Norwegian terrorist responsible for the massacre of 77 people, mostly youth, in Oslo and Utoya, Norway, in July 2011.

Extreme overvalued beliefs can be the cognitive-affective drivers of a pathological fixation – preoccupation with a particular person or cause that is accompanied by deterioration in social and occupational functioning. Fixation is a very frequent proximal warning behavior in targeted attacks where violence is planned, purposeful, and predatory. Although fixation is not a predictor of such attacks, its frequency—typically occurring in four out of five cases—across a variety of domains of targeted attackers prior to their actions provides support for its use as a correlate of such behavior.

Background 
German neuropsychiatrist Carl Wernicke is viewed as the first major contributor who coined the term "overvalued idea" (ueberwertige idee) in 1892. His terminology focused on overvalued ideas as being beliefs that were shared by others. Further, in this work, he stressed that overvalued ideas are different from having a mental illness. As a result, he argued that any criminal behavior could be incorrectly attributed to mental illness without proper understanding of the beliefs or background that may underlie an individual's actions.

The current understanding of the term overvalued idea is less clear and concise in today's literature. While most sources agree that an overvalued idea is not necessarily false and is shared among individuals of a given culture or subculture, the definition of an overvalued idea by the American Psychiatric Association (APA) in DSM-5-TR is defined as a belief that is not generally shared or accepted by other members of a given group or culture—the exact opposite of its historical meaning.

This concept of an overvalued idea described by Wernicke has since been re-examined along with other sources describing it within the literature and used as a basis for coining the term extreme overvalued belief.

Importance 
Extreme overvalued beliefs are seen as a predominant motivator driving terrorist attacks, assassins, and mass shootings.

Often times, forensic psychiatrists and psychologists encounter a patient who seems to hold very strange or bizarre beliefs when conducting either a threat assessment or a forensic examination (e.g., for the purposes of an insanity defense). However, these beliefs do not adequately meet DSM-5-TR criteria for a psychiatric disorder and cannot be fully explained by the existing psychiatric terms such as delusion or obsession. Further, the lack of clear and concise definitions of many psychiatric terms can further complicate matters. As a result, the media and psychiatrists often erroneously define individuals who have carried out inexplicable acts of terrorism or violence as having been driven by delusions, obsessions or paranoia. Instead, what these individuals actually possess are extreme overvalued beliefs, and the acts they have committed are seen by them as a defense to uphold those beliefs.

It is of major importance to create clear definitions of psychiatric terms, such as the new term extreme overvalued beliefs, so that both media and psychiatrists do not erroneously explain acts of violence or terrorism as being carried out by those who have a mental illness.

Differences: Delusions vs. Obsessions vs. Extreme Overvalued Beliefs 
Delusions are by definition false beliefs that are not shared by other members of an individual's group or society. These are often held with strong commitment, even in the face of direct evidence to the contrary, and are idiosyncratic, often bizarre, and personalized.

Obsessions are intrusive thoughts or images that are often very disturbing to the individual who has them. These are often distressing, and therefore may lead to carrying out compensatory behaviors (i.e. compulsions) to alleviate the distress (see obsessive-compulsive disorder) for a period of time.

Notably, both delusions and obsessions are different from extreme overvalued beliefs.

While extreme overvalued beliefs are shared by individuals of the same culture and/or subculture, this is not true of delusions.  A delusion is an inherently false belief that is not shared by anyone else, while an extreme overvalued belief is shared by others and can become more dominant over time. Further, when an extreme overvalued belief is considered within the context of the group that possesses it, it is not necessarily false or extreme from within their perspective.

In addition, while overvalued beliefs and obsessions are similar in that they can both grow to dominate an individual's mind and take control of their everyday life, they also differ in that obsessions are distressing to the individual while extreme overvalued beliefs are not "fought off". In fact, individuals with extreme overvalued beliefs will amplify their belief over time and defend it with extreme actions, in some cases using violence.

Cases: Demonstrating Application of the term Extreme Overvalued Belief

2011 Norway Attacks: Anders Breivik 
The case of Anders Breivik, the man responsible for the 2011 Norway attacks that resulted in the mass murder of 77 individuals near Oslo, is an example of a case that posed great challenges to forensic psychiatrists as there was controversy regarding his diagnosis. Further, this case is an example of one in which extreme overvalued beliefs were likely mistaken for psychosis. In examining Mr. Breivik's case, it is important to examine the history and nature of his beliefs. Just prior to the attacks in 2011, Mr. Breivik distributed a 1500 page collection entitled "2083: A European Declaration of Independence" to several thousand people. This document claimed he was a "savior of Christianity" and that he was part of the "Knights Templar".

The first team of psychiatrists to evaluate him provided a diagnosis of schizophrenia and opined that he was legally insane. However, this decision was not well accepted throughout Norway so a second team of psychiatrists was appointed for further evaluation. The second team found him to not be psychotic and in fact legally sane at the time he committed his crimes. Notably, both of these forensic psychiatric teams agreed upon the following: 1) Anders Breivik did not have grossly disorganized behavior, 2) He did not experience/exhibit hallucinations, 3) He did not have a history consistent with a severe mental disorder, 4) He had no serious cognitive impairment impacting his daily life and 5) He exhibited pathological grandiosity. In addition, according to media report of his trial, Mr. Breivik completely defended his actions and he seemed to enjoy the attention of the trial which provided him an opportunity to further his agenda. His extreme beliefs regarding right-wing ideology were on full display in the courtroom during his trial as he often gestured with the Nazi salute.

However, the two teams disagreed regarding his social withdrawal as well as his bizarre beliefs of being a foot soldier for the Knights Templar. Notably, Team one believed his social withdrawal was consistent with negative symptoms of schizophrenia whereas Team two described this as a time he used to plan the attacks. Ultimately, team one offered a diagnosis of schizophrenia while team two offered a diagnosis of severe narcissistic personality disorder. Of note, the court ultimately agreed with team two's opinion which made him ineligible for criminal irresponsibility.

Importantly, the point here is not to challenge the diagnoses made by the psychiatric teams as these cases are well-known to be very difficult to make a diagnosis. Rather, Breivik's case emphasizes that current clinical guidelines do not adequately equip or allow forensic psychiatrists to agree upon what constitutes delusions versus nondelusions. Further, the use of a categorical approach to psychiatric disorders that only focuses on symptoms and/or examiner interpretations of patient behaviors likely accounts for some of this discrepancy.

An alternative approach that may have simplified this case at the beginning would be to consider the possibility of extreme overvalued beliefs as an explanation and major driver of Breivik's horrendous actions. Using this approach, the evidence against Mr. Breivik suggests he had angry, contemptuous and disgusting emotions regarding Muslims, immigrants, and liberal political parties, and that these emotions seemed to dominate his mind.  Mr. Breivik's beliefs were not accompanied by other cardinal symptoms seen in severe mental illness (e.g. hallucinations, impairment in daily life), and his beliefs were not considered bizarre by the court, especially when seen in the context of right-wing political ideologies that currently exist. As a result, these beliefs were inherently not delusions as they were shared to some degree by others of who endorsed his extreme right wing nationalist ideology. Further, his manifesto was not a form of disorganized speech, but rather a collection of beliefs that he had copied, searched and reinforced over time, and manipulated, which suggests he "relished, amplified, and defended” these beliefs prior to and even throughout his trial.  Moreover, Breivik heralded the onset of a mishmash of ideologies, variously referred to as salad bar, cafeteria, and copypaste extremist belief systems adopted by targeted attackers.

Mr. Breivik's inexplicable actions in the 2011 Norway Attacks were motivated by extreme overvalued beliefs stemming from right-wing ideology rather than an underlying psychotic disorder. His intense emotional commitment to defend these beliefs led to the mass murder of 77 people, mostly adolescents, in Norway on July 22.

9/11 Attacks: al-Qaeda 
On September 11, 2001, a series of attacks involving four hijacked passenger airplanes resulted in the death of nearly 3000 Americans. These attacks were carried out by a group of Al-Qaeda terrorists and together are regarded as the deadliest terrorist attack in United States history. The overall "mastermind" behind these attacks was Osama bin Laden, the leader of Al-Qaeda at that time. Osama bin Laden was known for believing that U.S. foreign policy had resulted in the oppression and deaths of Muslims in the Middle East. These beliefs evolved from bin Laden's radical Islamic ideology which involved numerous anti-Semitic and anti-Western beliefs. As seen below, Bin Laden expressed these beliefs when he identified himself and his agents as the perpetrators of these horrendous acts at the World Trade Center in 2001:"What the United States tastes today is a very small thing compared what we have tasted for tens of years. Our nation has been tasting this humiliation and contempt for more than 80 years. Its sons are being killed, its blood is being shed, its holy lands are being attacked, and it is not being ruled according to what God has decreed. Despite this, nobody cares."Osama bin Laden held a deep commitment to a literal interpretation of Islam, including Sharia law. He rigidly adhered to extreme overvalued beliefs of radical Islamic ideology, even noting that Americans should convert to Islam and turn away from their immoral ways of living. While these beliefs were extreme, they were not held in isolation.  Rather, these beliefs were shared with many other followers of the same radical Islamic ideology. As seen with the hijackings that resulted in the 09/11 Attacks, terrorists can exhibit rational thinking within their limited yet shared belief systems. As a result, these ideas appear irrational to outsiders but those who hold them will rigidly follow and defend them (Goertzel, 2002).   Extreme overvalued beliefs were clearly described by the Deputy Inspector General of the Department of Defense to Congress months prior to 9/11: "Considering the diversity of causes to which terrorists are committed, the uniformity of their rhetoric is striking. Polarizing and absolutist, it is a rhetoric of “us vs them.” It is rhetoric without nuance, without shades of gray. “They,” the establishment, are the source of all evil in vivid contrast to “us,” the freedom fighters, consumed by righteous rage. And, if “they” are the source of our problems, it follows ineluctably in the special psycho-logic of the terrorist, that “they” must be destroyed. It is the only just and moral thing to do. Once one accepts the basic premises, the logical reasoning is flawless."bin Laden rationalized the attacks in defense of his extreme beliefs by emphasizing the horrendous impact that he believed American foreign policy had on the people of his nation and that the actions of Al-Qaeda were more than justified by what Muslims had endured for many decades. The extreme beliefs held by those like Osama bin Laden grew over time, became amplified by selective exposure to ideas and media sources that only supported these beliefs, and became more resistant to change.  Many individuals belonging to Al-Qaeda, and now the Islamic State, continue to hold an intense emotional commitment to the belief that American foreign policy has not only humiliated but harmed Muslims in the Middle East. In defending these extreme overvalued beliefs, a group of Al-Qaeda terrorists hijacked multiple airplanes full of innocent passengers and then flew them into buildings full of innocent people on September 11, 2001.

Oklahoma City Bombing: Timothy McVeigh 
Timothy McVeigh is the individual responsible for detonating a 5000 pound ammonium nitrate fertilizer bomb on April 19, 1995. The Oklahoma City Bombing took place in front of the Murrah Federal Building in Oklahoma City. It killed 168 individuals and McVeigh was subsequently arrested, later convicted and was executed by lethal injection in 2001.

Neither Timothy McVeigh, nor his co-conspirator Terry Nichols, entered a mental disability (insanity) defense. As a result, they were never formally assessed by a forensic psychiatrist. However, numerous pieces of evidence presented during the trial suggest Timothy McVeigh was likely driven by extreme overvalued beliefs he had against the US government which were shared by others in the subculture with whom he identified.

More specifically, McVeigh held a personal grievance because he failed an endurance run to qualify for the US Army Special Forces. He was invited back, but was instead humiliated by this rejection, and blamed the government for his failure.  After he left the Army, he became devoted to the Patriot Movement which held an ideology composed of "...anti‐government, anti‐ abortion, anti‐semitic, pro‐Second Amendment, racist and White ethnic nationalist beliefs." McVeigh and others of the Patriot Movement also blamed the US government for the death of men, women and children of the Branch Davidian group which occurred during federal interventions at the Davidian compound in Waco, Texas on April 19, 1993.

Timothy McVeigh held two extreme overvalued beliefs that drove his pathological fixation against the US government and his subsequent bombing of the Murrah Federal Building. First, he believed he would become the "first hero of the second American Revolution;" and second, he believed that the bombing would spark the violent overthrow of the US government. These beliefs, which were held by others within the Patriot Movement, were shared by McVeigh with other individuals between 1993-1995 (specifically his sister Jennifer). In these letters, his beliefs were relished, amplified, defended, and became more resistant to change over the two years leading up to the Oklahoma City bombing.

Assassins: John Hinckley Jr., John Wilkes Booth

John Hinckley Jr. 
John Hinckley Jr. is known for his attempted assassination of President Ronald Reagan on March 30, 1981. During Mr. Hinckley's trial, a lot of attention was directed to his odd beliefs stemming from his fascination with the actress Jodie Foster in the movie "Taxi Driver". Notably, in this movie, Jodie Foster plays a prostitute who becomes friends with a cab driver named "Travis Bickle". In the movie, Bickle then goes on to plan and attempt a failed assassination of a US presidential candidate.

In this trial, the defense argued that Mr. Hinckley had delusions as a result of schizophrenia and he had "...identified with Travis Bickle and picked up in automatic ways many [of his] attributes." The jury was also presented with numerous disturbing letters written by Mr. Hinckley to Jodie Foster in which he said he planned to win her heart by "getting Reagan". However, the prosecution expert testified that Mr. Hinckley was in fact not delusional but just had "unrealistic hopes" based on the movies he watched that included Jodie Foster.

In this case, the jury was left with considering whether or not Mr. Hinckley had delusions or obsessions regarding his relationship with Jodie Foster. An alternative that could have been considered by the jury is that Mr. Hinckley held extreme overvalued beliefs regarding a possible relationship with Jodie Foster. It was clear through the letters he wrote to Jodie Foster that he amplified and defended the affection he had for her. Over time, these beliefs grew to dominate his mind and he developed an intense emotional commitment to Jodie Foster. His extreme overvalued belief of having a relationship with Jodie Foster led to Mr. Hinckley carrying out an attempted assassination against President Reagan as a way to defend his commitment.

Mr. Hinckley is not alone as many individuals in our society share a devoted attitude or passionate love for celebrities. In this case, while he held an extreme overvalued belief that by "getting Reagan" he could win the heart of Jodie Foster, he did not have a loss of reality testing or show any cardinal symptoms of psychosis that would be consistent with a diagnosis of schizophrenia. Overall, his passionate and dominant love for a celebrity (Jodie Foster), an attitude that is often shared by others in society for celebrities, was an extreme overvalued belief.  His diagnosis over the course of years at St. Elizabeths Hospital in Washington, DC, was narcissistic personality disorder.

John Wilkes Booth 
John Wilkes Booth is the man who assassinated President Lincoln at Ford's Theatre on April 14, 1865. He infamously yelled  “sic semper tyrannis! The South is avenged,” when he jumped onto the stage after fatally shooting President Lincoln in the head. Mr. Booth was a well-known actor and he held strong beliefs that President Lincoln was “an American Caesar.” 

Of note, the phrase Mr. Booth yelled after assassinating President Lincoln means “thus always to tyrants”. It has frequently served as a justifying rallying cry against dictators. Some have even used it to justify radical views and acts of violence. This same phase was found on a T-shirt worn by Timothy McVeigh when he bombed the federal building in Oklahoma City on April 19, 1995.

John Wilkes Booth held extreme overvalued beliefs about President Lincoln's role as a "dictator" in reference to his political agenda at the time. He relished, amplified, and defended these beliefs which became resistant to change. In service to these beliefs, he carried out the assassination of President Lincoln. While his beliefs were of fanatical nature, many previous Presidential assassins have shared similar, non-delusional, yet highly rigid beliefs.  In counterpoint to Booth, John Brown was a violent abolitionist prior to the Civil War who held many extreme overvalued beliefs, and engaged in the killing of others to fight against slavery.

References

Psych
Behavioral concepts
Psychiatry
Forensic psychiatrists